Neohoodiella is a genus of thrips in the family Phlaeothripidae, first described by Jean-Paul Bournier in 1997 from specimens collected in New Caledonia, but found also in Australia, in Queensland and in New South Wales.

There are two species: Neohoodiella grandsetis  (found in New Caledonia), and Neohoodiella jennibeardae (found in Australia).

References

External links 

 Description of Neohoodiella (Lucid Australian Thrips key)

Phlaeothripidae
Thrips
Thrips genera